Dóra Danics (born 16 May 1986, Budapest) is a Hungarian singer, most notable for being the winner of the fourth season of X-Faktor.

Life 
Danics is the daughter of Szilvia Bach, one of the more well-known entertainers in the period from the end of communism in Hungary. Danics played for seven years in an acoustic band. She first participated in the X-Faktor in 2012 was eliminated. In 2013, with the mentoring of Péter Geszti, won the fourth season of X-Faktor. While she never dueled, Danics was the first woman to win the show.

Discography

Chart-topping songs

Awards 
 2014: BRAVO OTTO - Az Év Felfedezettje (jelölés)

External links 
 http://starity.hu/sztarok/danics-dora/eletrajz/
 http://kocsma.blog.hu/2012/10/29/danics_dora

References 

1986 births
21st-century Hungarian women singers
Musicians from Budapest
Living people